Ruslan Oleksiyovych Neshcheret (born 22 January 2002) is a Ukrainian professional footballer who plays as a goalkeeper for Dynamo Kyiv.

Career
Neshcheret is a product of the Youth Sportive School in his native Mukachevo and Dynamo Kyiv sportive school systems.

In July 2019, he was promoted to the Dynamo Kyiv main squad and made his debut in the Ukrainian Premier League on 31 October 2020, starting in an away match against Dnipro-1. He participated in the 2019–20 UEFA Youth League, where he managed to keep 4 clean sheets. On 4 November 2020, he made his UEFA Champions League debut in a 2–1 defeat against Barcelona in the 2020–21 season, in which he made 12 saves to be the joint-third most saves in a single match in that competition.

Honour
Dynamo Kyiv
Ukrainian Premier League: 2020–21

References

External links 
 
 

2002 births
Living people
People from Mukachevo
Ukrainian footballers
Ukraine youth international footballers
Ukraine under-21 international footballers
Association football goalkeepers
FC Dynamo Kyiv players
Ukrainian Premier League players
Sportspeople from Zakarpattia Oblast